Cravinhos is a municipality in the state of São Paulo in Brazil. The population is 35,579 (2020 estimate) in an area of 311 km². The elevation is 788 m.

References

Municipalities in São Paulo (state)